The 1988–89 season was the 87th in the history of the Western Football League.

The league champions for the third time in their history were Saltash United. The champions of Division One were Larkhall Athletic.

Final tables

Premier Division
The Premier Division was reduced from 22 to 21 clubs after Melksham Town and Clandown were relegated to the First Division, and Bristol City Reserves also left. Two clubs joined:

Chard Town, runners-up in the First Division.
Welton Rovers, champions of the First Division.

First Division
The First Division was increased from 19 to 20 clubs, after Chard Town and Welton Rovers were promoted to the Premier Division. Three new clubs joined:

Bridport, promoted from the Dorset Combination.
Clandown, relegated from the Premier Division.
Melksham Town, relegated from the Premier Division.

References

Western Football League seasons
6